Koehler Nunatak is an isolated nunatak about  east-southeast of Mount Manthe, at the southeastern margin of the Hudson Mountains, Antarctica. It was mapped by the United States Geological Survey from ground surveys and U.S. Navy air photos, 1960–66, and was named by the Advisory Committee on Antarctic Names for Walter Koehler, U.S. Army Aviation Detachment, helicopter pilot for the Ellsworth Land Survey, 1968–69.

References

Nunataks of Ellsworth Land